Chakghat is a town and a nagar panchayat in Teonthar Block Rewa district  in the state of Madhya Pradesh, India.

Demographics
 India census, Chakghat NP had a population of 18,000. Males constitute 43% of the population and females 57%.  18% of the population is under 6 years of age.

Transport
By bus

Bus stand available in the city bus stand chakghat.

By Train

By air
Nearest Airport in Prayagraj, Uttar Pradesh.

References

Cities and towns in Rewa district